In vector calculus, divergence is a vector operator that operates on a vector field, producing a scalar field giving the quantity of the vector field's source at each point. More technically, the divergence represents the volume density of the outward flux of a vector field from an infinitesimal volume around a given point.

As an example, consider air as it is heated or cooled. The velocity of the air at each point defines a vector field. While air is heated in a region, it expands in all directions, and thus the velocity field points outward from that region. The divergence of the velocity field in that region would thus have a positive value. While the air is cooled and thus contracting, the divergence of the velocity has a negative value.

Physical interpretation of divergence 
In physical terms, the divergence of a vector field is the extent to which the vector field flux behaves like a source at a given point. It is a local measure of its "outgoingness" – the extent to which there are more of the field vectors exiting from an infinitesimal region of space than entering it.   A point at which the flux is outgoing has positive divergence, and is often called a "source" of the field.  A point at which the flux is directed inward has negative divergence, and is often called a "sink" of the field.  The greater the flux of field through a small surface enclosing a given point, the greater the value of divergence at that point.  A point at which there is zero flux through an enclosing surface has zero divergence.

The divergence of a vector field is often illustrated using the simple example of the velocity field of a fluid, a liquid or gas.  A moving gas has a velocity, a speed and direction at each point, which can be represented by a vector, so the velocity of the gas forms a vector field. If a gas is heated, it will expand.  This will cause a net motion of gas particles outward in all directions.  Any closed surface in the gas will enclose gas which is expanding, so there will be an outward flux of gas through the surface.  So the velocity field will have positive divergence everywhere.  Similarly, if the gas is cooled, it will contract.  There will be more room for gas particles in any volume, so the external pressure of the fluid will cause a net flow of gas volume inward through any closed surface.  Therefore the velocity field has negative divergence everywhere.  In contrast, in a gas at a constant temperature and pressure, the net flux of gas out of any closed surface is zero.  The gas may be moving, but the volume rate of gas flowing into any closed surface must equal the volume rate flowing out, so the net flux is zero. Thus the gas velocity has zero divergence everywhere.  A field which has zero divergence everywhere is called  solenoidal.

If the gas is heated only at one point or small region, or a small tube is introduced which supplies a source of additional gas at one point, the gas there will expand, pushing fluid particles around it outward in all directions. This will cause an outward velocity field throughout the gas, centered on the heated point.  Any closed surface enclosing the heated point will have a flux of gas particles passing out of it, so there is positive divergence at that point.  However any closed surface not enclosing the point will have a constant density of gas inside, so just as many fluid particles are entering as leaving the volume, thus the net flux out of the volume is zero.  Therefore the divergence at any other point is zero.

Definition 

It can be shown that the above limit always converges to the same value for any sequence of volumes that contain  and approach zero volume.

Since this definition is coordinate-free, it shows that the divergence is the same in any coordinate system.  However it is not often used practically to calculate divergence; when the vector field is given in a coordinate system the coordinate definitions below are much simpler to use.

A vector field with zero divergence everywhere is called solenoidal – in which case any closed surface has no net flux across it.

Definition in coordinates

Cartesian coordinates

In three-dimensional Cartesian coordinates, the divergence of a continuously differentiable vector field  is defined as the scalar-valued function:

Although expressed in terms of coordinates, the result is invariant under rotations, as the physical interpretation suggests. This is because the trace of the Jacobian matrix of an -dimensional vector field  in -dimensional space is invariant under any invertible linear transformation.

Because applying an operator is different from multiplying the components, this is considered an abuse of notation.

Cylindrical coordinates 
For a vector expressed in local unit cylindrical coordinates as

where  is the unit vector in direction , the divergence is

The use of local coordinates is vital for the validity of the expression. In particular, if we consider the identity function , we find that:

.

Spherical coordinates 
In spherical coordinates, with  the angle with the  axis and  the rotation around the  axis, and  again written in local unit coordinates, the divergence is

Tensor field 
Let  be continuously differentiable second-order tensor field  defined as follows:

the divergence in cartesian coordinate system is a first-order tensor field and can be defined in two ways:

and

We have

If tensor is symmetric  then . Because of this, often in the literature the two definitions (and symbols  and ) are used interchangeably (especially in mechanics equations where tensor symmetry is assumed).

General coordinates 
Here, the upper index refers to the number of the coordinate or component, so  refers to the second component, and not the quantity  squared. The divergence can then be written via the Voss-Weyl formula, as:

The volume coefficient  is a function of position which depends on the coordinate system. The determinant appears because it provides the appropriate invariant definition of the volume, given a set of vectors. Since the determinant is a scalar quantity which doesn't depend on the indices, these can be suppressed, writing . The absolute value is taken in order to handle the general case where the determinant might be negative, such as in pseudo-Riemannian spaces. The reason for the square-root is a bit subtle: it effectively avoids double-counting as one goes from curved to Cartesian coordinates, and back. The volume (the determinant) can also be understood as the Jacobian of the transformation from Cartesian to curvilinear coordinates, which for  gives 

Some conventions expect all local basis elements to be normalized to unit length, as was done in the previous sections.

using one of the properties of the metric tensor. By dotting both sides of the last equality with the contravariant element , we can conclude that . After substituting, the formula becomes:

See  for further discussion.

Properties 

The following properties can all be derived from the ordinary differentiation rules of calculus. Most importantly, the divergence is a linear operator, i.e.,

or in more suggestive notation

or

The Laplacian of a scalar field is the divergence of the field's gradient:

The divergence of the curl of any vector field (in three dimensions) is equal to zero: 

For regions in  more topologically complicated than this, the latter statement might be false (see Poincaré lemma). The degree of failure of the truth of the statement, measured by the homology of the chain complex

serves as a nice quantification of the complicatedness of the underlying region . These are the beginnings and main motivations of de Rham cohomology.

Decomposition theorem

Moreover, these parts are explicitly determined by the respective source densities (see above) and circulation densities (see the article Curl):

For the irrotational part one has

with

by the circulation density .

This "decomposition theorem" is a by-product of the stationary case of electrodynamics. It is a special case of the more general Helmholtz decomposition, which works in dimensions greater than three as well.

In arbitrary finite dimensions

The divergence of a vector field can be defined in any finite number  of dimensions. If 

in a Euclidean coordinate system with coordinates , define

In the 1D case,  reduces to a regular function, and the divergence reduces to the derivative.

For any , the divergence is a linear operator, and it satisfies the "product rule"

for any scalar-valued function .

Relation to the exterior derivative
Define the current two-form as

It measures the amount of "stuff" flowing through a surface per unit time in a "stuff fluid" of density  moving with local velocity . Its exterior derivative  is then given by

where  is the wedge product.

Thus, the divergence of the vector field  can be expressed as:

When the divergence is written in this way, the operator  is referred to as the codifferential. Working with the current two-form and the exterior derivative is usually easier than working with the vector field and divergence, because unlike the divergence, the exterior derivative commutes with a change of (curvilinear) coordinate system.

In curvilinear coordinates
The appropriate expression is more complicated in curvilinear coordinates. The divergence of a vector field extends naturally to any differentiable manifold of dimension  that has a volume form (or density) , e.g. a Riemannian or Lorentzian manifold. The divergence is then the function defined by

The divergence can be defined in terms of the Lie derivative as

This means that the divergence measures the rate of expansion of a unit of volume (a volume element) as it flows with the vector field.

On a pseudo-Riemannian manifold, the divergence with respect to the volume can be expressed in terms of the Levi-Civita connection :

where the second expression is the contraction of the vector field valued 1-form  with itself and the last expression is the traditional coordinate expression from Ricci calculus.

An equivalent expression without using a connection is

where  is the metric and  denotes the partial derivative with respect to coordinate . The square-root of the (absolute value of the determinant of the) metric appears because the divergence must be written with the correct conception of the volume.  In curvilinear coordinates, the basis vectors are no longer orthonormal; the determinant encodes the correct idea of volume in this case. It appears twice, here, once, so that the  can be transformed into "flat space" (where coordinates are actually orthonormal), and once again so that  is also transformed into "flat space", so that finally, the "ordinary" divergence can be written with the "ordinary" concept of volume in flat space (i.e. unit volume, i.e. one, i.e. not written down). The square-root appears in the denominator, because the derivative transforms in the opposite way (contravariantly) to the vector (which is covariant). This idea of getting to a "flat coordinate system" where local computations can be done in a conventional way is called a vielbein. A different way to see this is to note that the divergence is the codifferential in disguise. That is, the divergence corresponds to the expression  with  the differential and  the Hodge star. The Hodge star, by its construction, causes the volume form to appear in all of the right places.

The divergence of tensors
Divergence can also be generalised to tensors. In Einstein notation, the divergence of a contravariant vector  is given by

where  denotes the covariant derivative. In this general setting, the correct formulation of the divergence is to recognize that it is a codifferential; the appropriate properties follow from there.

that is, we take the trace over the first two covariant indices of the covariant derivative.
The  symbol refers to the musical isomorphism.

See also
Curl
Del in cylindrical and spherical coordinates
Divergence theorem
Gradient

Notes

Citations

References

External links 

 
 The idea of divergence of a vector field
 Khan Academy: Divergence video lesson
 

Differential operators
Linear operators in calculus
Vector calculus